Jiří Veselý was the defending champion, but decided not to participate.

Damir Džumhur won the title, defeating Pere Riba in the final, 7–6(7–4), 6–3. It was his first Challenger title in his career.

Seeds 

  Pere Riba (final)
  Andreas Haider-Maurer (first round)
  Aljaž Bedene (semifinals)
  Julian Reister (quarterfinals)
  Adrian Ungur (second round)
  Michael Berrer (second round)
  Marsel İlhan (first round)
  Damir Džumhur (champion)

Draw

Finals

Top half

Bottom half

References
 Main Draw
 Qualifying Draw

Mersin Cup - Singles
2014 Singles